A Free People is a 1925 German silent drama film directed by Martin Berger and starring Albert Florath and Ellen Plessow. It is now considered a lost film.

It was one of two films made by Berger under commission from the SPD along with 1924's The Forge. Neither of them were commercial successes on release. The film's art direction was by Robert A. Dietrich.

A servant leads a campaign against the justice of his employer, leading eventually to civil war and a general strike.

Cast
In alphabetical order

References

Bibliography

External links

1925 films
Films of the Weimar Republic
Films directed by Martin Berger
German silent feature films
1925 drama films
German drama films
German black-and-white films
Lost German films
Silent drama films
1920s German films